FK Vasilevo is a football club based in the village of Vasilevo near Strumica, North Macedonia. They were recently competed in the Macedonian Third League (East Division).

History
The club was founded in 1950.

References

External links
FK Vasilevo Facebook 
Club info at MacedonianFootball 
Football Federation of Macedonia 

Vasilevo
Association football clubs established in 1950
1950 establishments in the Socialist Republic of Macedonia
FK